Housing NSW, formerly the Housing Commission of New South Wales and before that the New South Wales Housing Board, was an agency of the Department of Communities and Justice that was responsible for the provision and management of public housing services with the aim to prevent homelessness in the state of New South Wales, Australia.

Purpose and function
Housing NSW provides a range of services including public and community housing, housing for people of Aboriginal and Torres Strait Islander backgrounds, support services for people with special needs linked to government and non-government agencies, private rental assistance and subsidies, advice and assistance for home-buyers, the development of affordable housing, community regeneration, and development and regulation of social housing policies.

Initially the role of the Housing Commission was to investigate housing affordability and standards, co-ordinate with associated agencies, publish its findings and general information about housing, take steps to improve housing standards and recommend further legislation.

The commission was responsible for the provision of post-war housing in the 1940s and 1950s, often using cheap fibro materials due to shortages of other materials such as bricks.  It was also responsible for slum clearance in the 1960s and the replacement of terraced housing in the Waterloo area with high rise public housing towers. In the 1970s, the now-discredited American Radburn style of public housing was used, especially in the south western suburbs of Sydney.  Phyllis Le Cappelaine Burke served on the commission for twenty years, from 1945 to 1965, and advocated for policies to improve the lives of women in public housing.

Prior to the establishment of the Housing Commission, a Housing Board was established in April 1912 under the authority of the NSW Colonial Secretary.

High Rise Developments (6 stories and higher)

Sites

Camperdown
Johanna O'Dea Court Pyrmont Bridge Rd (Corner of Lyons Rd), 1 building, next to Homeless accommodation and walk-up flats complex (Y-Shaped)

Chifley
Namatjira Pl, 3 buildings, walk-up flats complex (I-Shaped)

Eastlakes
Rosebery Apartments Maloney Street, (Corner of Leon Lachal Reserve), 2 unit blocks, linked by stairs/elevator block (I-Shaped)
Eastlakes Apartments Florence Avenue, (Corner of Evans Avenue), 2 unit blocks, walk-up flats complex (I-Shaped)

Gladesville
Manning Rd, (Corner of Victoria Rd), 2 buildings (I-Shaped)\

Kirribilli
Greenway, (Greenway Dr), 6 conjoined buildings adjacent to smaller complex (2 L-Shaped, 2 rectangle-shaped, 2 Y-shaped, 1 T-shaped)

Lilyfield
Lilyfield Rd, (Corner of Grove St), 1 building adjacent to 2 housing estates and duplex cottages (B-Shaped)

Newtown
Station St, (Corner of Reiby Pl) 1 rectangular block
Forbes St, (Corner of Elvy Pl) 1 building in Golden Grove Housing Complex (P-Shaped)

North Bondi
Elanora, (Hardy St) 1 building (U-Shaped)

Redfern
Mckell, Lawson, Gilmore, Kendall Morehead St, 3 buildings adjacent to housing estate (3 double conjoined rectangular towers, 1 X-Shaped)
Purcell, (1 I-shaped Block)

Riverwood
Lincoln, Jefferson adjacent to large housing estate (2 triple conjoined square-shaped towers)

Surry Hills
John Northcott Place , 2 buildings, surrounded by walk-up complex (3 rectangular blocks conjoined with Y shaped tower, 1 I shaped surrounded by walk-ups)

Telopea
Sturt St (Corner of Wade St), adjacent to large housing estate (3 square-shaped towers)

The Rocks
Sirius building, 1 building adjacent to large housing estate, (/-shaped) (Sold to Private Developers) 

Waterloo, New South Wales
Cook, Matavai, Turanga, Solander, Marton and Banks, adjacent to large housing estate, 6 buildings (4 I-shaped, 2 rectangle-shaped)
Pitt St (Corner of Kellick St), 2 buildings (U-shaped)

See also
 List of New South Wales government agencies
 Public housing in Australia
 HomeFund, a government home loan scheme targeted at public housing tenants

References

External links
 Housing NSW - web page

1942 establishments in Australia
Public housing in Australia
Government agencies of New South Wales
Radburn design housing estates